William Walton Griest (September 22, 1858 – December 5, 1929) was a Republican member of the U.S. House of Representatives from Pennsylvania.

Biography
William W. Griest was born in Christiana, Pennsylvania.  He graduated from the Millersville State Normal School in 1876.  He was engaged in teaching, and was a member of the city school board of Lancaster, Pennsylvania, for twenty-four years.  He was the director and an incorporator of the Pennsylvania Public School Memorial Association.  From 1882 to 1888, he was engaged in newspaper work as editor of the Inquirer, Lancaster, Pennsylvania.  He served as chief clerk in the county commissioner's office.  He was a member of the Pennsylvania Tax Commission, and a delegate to several Republican State conventions and to every Republican National Convention from 1896 to 1928.  He was the Secretary of the Commonwealth of Pennsylvania from 1899 to 1903.  He served as a member of the State sinking fund commission and of the board of pardons.  He also served as president of lighting and street railway companies from 1903 to 1927.

Griest was elected as a Republican to the Sixty-first and to the ten succeeding Congresses and served until his death at Mount Clemens, Michigan.  He served as chairman of the United States House Committee on Post Office and Post Roads during the Sixty-eighth through the Seventieth Congresses.  He was laid to rest at Woodward Hill Cemetery in Lancaster.

The W. W. Griest Building in downtown Lancaster is named in his honor.

See also
List of United States Congress members who died in office (1900–49)

Sources

The Political Graveyard

Politicians from Lancaster, Pennsylvania
Schoolteachers from Pennsylvania
1858 births
1929 deaths
Secretaries of the Commonwealth of Pennsylvania
Millersville University of Pennsylvania alumni
Republican Party members of the United States House of Representatives from Pennsylvania
Journalists from Pennsylvania
19th-century American newspaper editors
19th-century American politicians
20th-century American politicians
Burials at Woodward Hill Cemetery